Bi Bi Gol Mordeh-ye Olya (also Romanized as Bī Bī Gol Mordeh-ye ‘Olyā) is a village in Holayjan Rural District, in the Central District of Izeh County, Khuzestan Province, Iran. At the 2006 census, its population was 42, in 10 families.

References 

Populated places in Izeh County